James Percival (born 9 November 1983) is a rugby union player for Worcester Warriors in the RFU Championship after signing from Harlequins in the Summer of 2011. He primarily plays in the second-row.

Percival started out at Worcester Warriors, gaining International recognition as a member of Welsh Schools Under 18's and the England Under 21 team that won the 2004 Six Nations Grand Slam.

He joined Northampton Saints in the summer of 2005, however his progress was hampered after suffering a broken neck in a friendly game against Munster. This injury ruled him out of action for the whole of the 2005–06 season.

Percival spent much of the 2006–07 campaign with a successful on-loan spell at Bedford Blues to get post injury game time.

Percival left Northampton Saints to join Harlequins in the summer of 2007 and participated in successful Guinness Premiership and Heineken Cup campaigns.

At the end of the 2010/2011 Aviva Premiership campaign, Percival left Harlequins and signed a 2-year contract which saw him return to the newly promoted Worcester Warriors, and the club where he started his career. Percival will stay with the Warriors until at least the end of the 2012/2013 season.

References

External links
Harlequins profile
Guinness Premiership profile
Worcester Warriors Profile
 https://web.archive.org/web/20120827035802/http://www.warriors.co.uk/warriors/matchcentre/players_warriors_first_team.php?player=4804&includeref=dynamic

1983 births
Living people
English rugby union players
Rugby union players from West Midlands
Worcester Warriors players
Rugby union locks